Callimenellus is an Asian genus of bush crickets in the subfamily Pseudophyllinae. It is the sole genus in the tribe Callimenellini.

Species are distributed in: India, China, Indo-China and the Philippines.

Species
The Catalogue of Life lists:
 Callimenellus albolineatus Gorochov & Voltshenkova, 2005
 Callimenellus albomaculatus Gorochov & Voltshenkova, 2005
 Callimenellus apterus Beier, 1944
 Callimenellus beybienkoi Gorochov & Voltshenkova, 2005
 Callimenellus changi Gorochov & Voltshenkova, 2005
 Callimenellus distinctus Gorochov & Voltshenkova, 2005
 Callimenellus ferrugineus Brunner von Wattenwyl, 1895
 Callimenellus fumidus Walker, 1871- type species (China, Vietnam)
 Callimenellus maculatus Gorochov & Voltshenkova, 2005
 Callimenellus modestus Gorochov & Voltshenkova, 2005
 Callimenellus opacus Brunner von Wattenwyl, 1893
 Callimenellus variegatus Gorochov & Voltshenkova, 2005

References

External links
 

Tettigoniidae genera
Pseudophyllinae
Orthoptera of Indo-China